Paraguay competed at the 2016 Summer Olympics in Rio de Janeiro, Brazil, from 5 to 21 August 2016. Since the nation's official debut in 1968, Paraguayan athletes had appeared in every edition of the Summer Olympic Games, but did not attend the 1980 Summer Olympics in Moscow because of the nation's partial support for the US-led boycott.

Paraguay Olympic Committee confirmed a team of 11 athletes, six men and five women, to compete in seven sports at the Games. It was the nation's largest delegation sent to the Olympics without the men's football squad since 1984, and the first with a highest percentage of women in its history.

The Paraguayan roster featured five returning Olympians; two of them attended their third Games as the most experienced competitors, including table tennis player Marcelo Aguirre, and freestyle swimmer Benjamin Hockin, who represented Great Britain as a member of the relay squad on his Olympic debut in Beijing eight years earlier. Meanwhile, three other athletes competed at their maiden Olympics in London: single sculls rower Gabriela Mosqueira, Hockin's fellow swimmer Karen Riveros (women's 100 m freestyle), and tennis star Verónica Cepede Royg. World-ranked golfer Julieta Granada was selected to carry the flag for Paraguay in the opening ceremony, joining with rower Rocio Rivarola as the only females in the nation's history to accept the role.

Paraguay, however, failed to earn its first Olympic medal, since the 2004 Summer Olympics in Athens, where the men's football team took the silver.

Athletics (track and field) 
 
Paraguayan athletes have so far achieved qualifying standards in the following athletics events (up to a maximum of 3 athletes in each event):

Track & road events

Golf 

Paraguay has entered two golfers into the Olympic tournament. Fabrizio Zanotti (world no. 147) and Julieta Granada (world no. 135) qualified directly among the top 60 eligible players for their respective individual events based on the IGF World Rankings as of 11 July 2016.

Rowing

Paraguay has qualified one boat in the women's single sculls for the Olympics at the 2016 Latin American Continental Qualification Regatta in Valparaiso.

Qualification Legend: FA=Final A (medal); FB=Final B (non-medal); FC=Final C (non-medal); FD=Final D (non-medal); FE=Final E (non-medal); FF=Final F (non-medal); SA/B=Semifinals A/B; SC/D=Semifinals C/D; SE/F=Semifinals E/F; QF=Quarterfinals; R=Repechage

Shooting
 
Paraguay has received an invitation from the Tripartite Commission to send a men's double trap shooter to the Olympics, signifying the nation's comeback to the sport after an eight-year hiatus.

Qualification Legend: Q = Qualify for the next round; q = Qualify for the bronze medal (shotgun)

Swimming

Paraguay has received a Universality invitation from FINA to send two swimmers (one male and one female) to the Olympics.

Table tennis

Paraguay has received an invitation from the Tripartite Commission to send two-time Olympian Marcelo Aguirre in the men's singles to the Olympic table tennis tournament.

Tennis

Paraguay has received an invitation from the Tripartite Commission to send London 2012 Olympian Verónica Cepede Royg (world no. 136) in the women's singles into the Olympic tennis tournament.

See also
Paraguay at the 2015 Pan American Games

References

External links 
 

Nations at the 2016 Summer Olympics
2016
2016 in Paraguayan sport